Becke is a surname. Notable people with this surname include:

 Axel D. Becke (born 1953), Canadian physical chemist
 Daniel Becke (born 1978), German cyclist
 Edmund Becke (fl. 1550), British theological writer
 Florian Becke (born 1983), German bobsledder
 Friedrich Johann Karl Becke (1855–1931), Austrian mineralogist
Becke line test, an optical mineralogy technique developed by Friedrich Johann Karl Becke
 George Lewis Becke, (1855–1913), Australian Pacific trader, short-story writer and novelist
 Gregor Becke (born 1972), Austrian slalom canoer
 Brigadier-General John Becke (1879–1949), British Royal Flying Corps and Royal Air Force officer
 Shirley Becke (1917–2011), British police officer
 William Becke (1916–2009), British army officer

See also
Becke Moui, a town in Saint David Parish, Grenada